Arne Andersson (13 March 1921 – 23 February 2003) was a Swedish football player. He played professionally for IF Elfsborg and AIK at Allsvenskan (Swedish football top-tier).

References

1921 births
2003 deaths
Swedish footballers
IF Elfsborg players
AIK Fotboll players
Allsvenskan players
Association football midfielders